Internet filtering may refer to:
 Content-control software
 Internet censorship